Chris Mayotte (born September 16, 1957), is a former professional tennis player from the United States.  He enjoyed most of his tennis success while playing doubles.  During his career he won 3 doubles titles.

His younger brother Tim was a former ATP top 10 ranked singles player and won the silver medal at the 1988 Olympics.

Career finals

Doubles (3 titles)

External links
 
 

American male tennis players
Sportspeople from Springfield, Massachusetts
South Carolina Gamecocks men's tennis players
Tennis people from Massachusetts
Living people
1957 births